Brian Mark Smith  (born April 23, 1966) is a former American football linebacker who played in the National Football League (NFL) for the Los Angeles Rams. Smith attended Auburn University.

References

External links
 NFL.com player page

1966 births
Living people
American football linebackers
Auburn Tigers football players
Los Angeles Rams players
Sportspeople from Brooklyn
Players of American football from New York City